Bilyuin Pool is a permanent pool located about 90 kilometres north of Meekatharra in central Western Australia, and the far upper reaches of the Murchison River. It is a popular camping ground, and, in the wet season when it is reasonably full, a popular swimming hole. The ruins of the Bilyuin Hotel are there.

References
 StreetSmart Travellers Atlas of Western Australia (2002)
 

Mid West (Western Australia)
Sports venues in Western Australia
Swimming venues in Australia
Bathing in Australia
Natural pools